Terricula minor is a moth of the family Tortricidae. It is found in Vietnam.

The wingspan is 12 mm for males and 18 mm for females. The ground colour of the forewings is brown with scattered sparse bluish scales. The markings are dark brown and diffuse. The hindwings are dark brown. Females are darker and the refractive scales are more numerous.

Etymology
The name refers to size of the moth and the terminal process of the aedeagus and is derived from Latin minor (meaning smaller).

References

Moths described in 2008
Archipini
Moths of Asia
Taxa named by Józef Razowski